23 de Agosto Stadium, nicknamed La Tacita de Plata, is a football stadium in San Salvador de Jujuy, Argentina. The stadium is owned and operated by local club Gimnasia y Esgrima. 

The stadium, inaugurated in 1973, currently holds 25,000 people and was one of the venues for the 2011 Copa América, having also hosted some rugby union matches.

History 
It was inaugurated on March 18, 1973, the date on which the club's anniversary is celebrated. It was in a match of the 1st round of 1973 Torneo Regional v Vélez Sársfield de Catamarca, won by Gimnasia y Esgrima 2–0. In 2009, the AFA confirmed Jujuy as one of the venues for the 2011 Copa América, and the stadium was remodeled for that purpose. Works included expansion of the grandstands (up to 24,000 spectators) and addition of press boxes and a giant screen in the north side of the stadium. All the refurbishments allowed Estadio 23 de Agosto to host two matches of the competition.

Sporting events

Copa América 
The stadium hosted the following matches of the 2011 Copa América:

Rugby union 
Estadio Malvinas Argentinas has hosted several rugby union games, most of them Argentina tests, detailed below:

References

External links
 
 Stadium photos at Estadios de Argentina.com.ar

Gimnasia y Esgrima de Jujuy
23 de Agosto
23 de Agosto
Buildings and structures in Jujuy Province
Sport in Jujuy Province
1973 establishments in Argentina